Eric B. Schoomaker (born September 15, 1948) is a former United States Army lieutenant general who served as the 42nd Surgeon General of the United States Army and Commanding General, United States Army Medical Command, and a practicing hematologist. He previously served as Commanding General, North Atlantic Regional Medical Command and Walter Reed Army Medical Center. He assumed the post of U.S. Army Surgeon General on December 11, 2007.

Early life and education
Schoomaker was born into an Army family in Detroit, Michigan. He is the younger brother of General Peter Schoomaker, USA, who served as the 35th Chief of Staff of the United States Army. He attended East Lansing High School. In 1970 he graduated from the University of Michigan in Ann Arbor, was commissioned a second lieutenant as a Distinguished Military Graduate, and awarded a bachelor of science degree. He received his medical degree from the University of Michigan Medical School in 1975 and completed his PhD in Human Genetics in 1979.

Career
Schoomaker completed his internship and residency in internal medicine at Duke University Medical Center in Durham, North Carolina, from 1976 to 1978, followed by a fellowship in hematology at Duke University Medical Center in 1979. He is certified by the American Board of Internal Medicine in both internal medicine and hematology. His military education includes completion of the Combat Care Casualty Course, Medical Management of Chemical Casualty Care Course, AMEDD Officer Advanced Course, Command and General Staff College, and the U.S. Army War College.

Schoomaker has held a wide variety of assignments. From 1979 until 1982, he was a research hematologist at Walter Reed Army Institute of Research. He served as Assistant Chief and Program Director, Department of Medicine, Walter Reed Army Medical Center, from 1982 to 1988; Medical Consultant to Headquarters, 7th Medical Command, Heidelberg, Germany, 1988–1990; Deputy Commander for Clinical Services, Landstuhl Army Regional Medical Center, Landstuhl, Germany, 1990–1992; Chief and Program Director, Department of Medicine and Director of Primary Care, Madigan Army Medical Center, Tacoma, Washington, 1992–1995; Director of Medical Education for the Office of The Surgeon General/HQ USAMEDCOM conducting a split operation between Washington, DC, and Fort Sam Houston, Texas, 1995–1997; and Director of Clinical Operations at the HQ USAMEDCOM, February to July 1997. From July 1997 to July 1999, he commanded the USA MEDDAC (Evans Army Community Hospital) at Fort Carson, Colorado. He attended the U.S. Army War College in Carlisle Barracks, Pennsylvania, from 1999 to 2000 followed by assignments as the Command Surgeon for the U.S. Army Forces Command (FORSCOM) from July 2000 to March 2001, and Commander of the 30th Medical Brigade headquartered in Heidelberg, Germany, from April 2001 to June 2002.

In August 2002, The Army Surgeon General appointed General Schoomaker to the position of Chief of the Army Medical Corps. Prior to commanding at Fort Detrick, he was the Commanding General of the Southeast Regional Medical Command/Dwight David Eisenhower Army Medical Center from June 2002 to June 2005. Schoomaker was then the commanding general of the U.S. Army Medical Research and Materiel Command at Fort Detrick until March 2007. From March until December 11, 2007, he was commander of the North Atlantic Regional Medical Command and Walter Reed Army Medical Center.  From December 11, 2007, to December 5, 2011, Schoomaker served as the 42nd Surgeon General of the United States Army and Commanding General, United States Army Medical Command.

He currently teaches at Uniformed Services University of the Health Sciences.

Legacy
Schoomaker has been honored with the Order of Military Medical Merit and the "A" proficiency designator and holds the Expert Field Medical Badge.

Personal life
Schoomaker has three children.

Awards and decorations

References

External links
International Herald Tribune
Interview with Eric Schoomaker
US Army Biography

1948 births
Living people
Military personnel from Detroit
American people of Dutch descent
United States Army generals
Recipients of the Distinguished Service Medal (US Army)
Recipients of the Legion of Merit
Duke University alumni
Surgeons General of the United States Army
United States Army Command and General Staff College alumni
Recipients of the Badge of Honour of the Bundeswehr
United States Army War College alumni
University of Michigan Medical School alumni